Hotel Albert Commercial Block, also known as the Shoppes at the Albert House, is a historic hotel building located at Walterboro, Colleton County, South Carolina. The complex was built in 1912, and consists of four two-story brick structures. It was operated as a hotel until 1960, after which it housed apartments and various commercial enterprises. They buildings were restored in 1995.

It was listed in the National Register of Historic Places in 1999.

References

Hotel buildings on the National Register of Historic Places in South Carolina
Hotel buildings completed in 1912
Buildings and structures in Colleton County, South Carolina
National Register of Historic Places in Colleton County, South Carolina
1912 establishments in South Carolina